is a passenger railway station in located in the town of Inami, Hidaka District, Wakayama Prefecture, Japan, operated by West Japan Railway Company (JR West).

Lines

Station layout
The station consists of two opposed side platform s connected to the station building by a footbridge. The station is unattended.

Platforms

Adjacent stations

|-
!colspan=5|West Japan Railway Company (JR West)

History
Inahara Station opened on December 14, 1930. With the privatization of the Japan National Railways (JNR) on April 1, 1987, the station came under the aegis of the West Japan Railway Company.

Passenger statistics
In fiscal 2019, the station was used by an average of 68 passengers daily (boarding passengers only).

Surrounding Area
 Inami Municipal Inahara Elementary School
 Inami Municipal Inahara Junior High School
 Inahara Post Office

See also
List of railway stations in Japan

References

External links

 Inahara Station Official Site

Railway stations in Wakayama Prefecture
Railway stations in Japan opened in 1931
Inami, Wakayama